Louis de Bourbon (Louis I, Count of Vendôme) (1376 – December 21, 1446), younger son of John I, Count of La Marche and Catherine de Vendôme, was a French prince du sang, as well as Count of Vendôme from 1393, and Count of Castres from 1425 until his death.

Louis was a supporter of the duc d'Orléans, and obtained valuable posts at court, becoming Grand Chamberlain of France in 1408 and Grand Maître de France in 1413. As part of the Armagnac faction, he was at odds with the Burgundians, and was imprisoned by them twice, in 1407 and 1412. 

In 1414, Louis married Blanche (d. 1421), daughter of Hugh II, Count of Roucy; but he was captured the next year by the English at the Battle of Agincourt, and held by them for some time. Freed, he was in command of French forces at Cravant and later captured, 31 July 1423.

In 1424, he married Jeanne de Laval (d. 1468), daughter of Guy XIII, Count of Laval and Anne de Laval, at Rennes. Their children were:
 Catherine de Bourbon (b. 1425)
 Gabrielle de Bourbon (b. 1426)
 John VIII, Count of Vendôme (1425–1477)
He also had an illegitimate son, fathered with the Englishwoman, Sybil Bostum, during his captivity:
 John de Bourbon, Bastard of Vendôme (c. 1420–1496), Seigneur de Preaux.

Faithful to the king, he subsequently joined Joan of Arc and many other French nobles at the defense of Orléans in 1429, commanded at the siege of Jargeau, and assisted in the coronation at Reims. He was later present at the Treaty of Arras (1435). He died in Tours.

References

Sources

1376 births
1446 deaths
Counts of France
Counts of Vendôme
House of Bourbon
People of the Hundred Years' War
Grand Chamberlains of France
French prisoners of war in the Hundred Years' War